The Media Capture API is a web standard under development to allow web applications to access the media capture capabilities of a device (typically a Smartphone or other Mobile Internet device). This would allow a web application to include a function to record audio via the device's microphone, and take a picture or record a video with the device's camera.

The standard was discontinued by the World Wide Web Consortium in 2012, and is supported in the Android browser (from version 3.0+). The Media Capture API was replaced by The Media Capture and Streams API

External links 
 The Media Capture API - Page by the W3C

References 

Web standards